William Freeman Vilas (July 9, 1840August 27, 1908) was an American lawyer, politician, and United States Senator.  In the U.S. Senate, he represented the state of Wisconsin for one term, from 1891 to 1897.  As a prominent Bourbon Democrat, he was also a member of the cabinet of U.S. President Grover Cleveland, serving as the 33rd Postmaster General and the 17th Secretary of the Interior.

He was a major donor to the University of Wisconsin, leaving $30,000,000 to the school at his death in 1908. He is the namesake of Vilas Hall on the University of Wisconsin–Madison campus, as well as Vilas County, Wisconsin, and the towns of Vilas, Colorado, and Vilas, South Dakota.

Early life and education

Vilas was born in Chelsea, Vermont, the son of Esther Greene (Smilie) and Levi Baker Vilas, a politician. Vilas moved to Madison, Wisconsin with his family in 1851. He graduated from the University of Wisconsin in 1858, and from the Albany Law School in 1860.

Career
He enlisted in the Union Army during the Civil War and was a captain in the 23rd Wisconsin Volunteer Infantry Regiment and later served as the lieutenant colonel of that regiment.

Following the war, Vilas was a Professor of Law at the University of Wisconsin–Madison, and a regent of the University from 1880 to 1885 and 1898 to 1905. Vilas served as a member of the Wisconsin State Assembly in 1885, until he was appointed the Postmaster General between 1885 and 1888, and as Secretary of the Interior from 1888 to 1889, both under President Grover Cleveland.

After leaving the cabinet, he led Wisconsin German Americans in the protest against the Bennett Law of 1889 which required schools to only use the English language. From 1891 until 1897, he was a member of the United States Senate, in which, during President Cleveland's second term, he was recognized as the chief defender of the Administration, and he was especially active in securing the repeal of the silver purchase clause of the Sherman Silver Purchase Act. He was unsuccessful in an 1896 reelection bid, having been defeated by Senator John Coit Spooner.

Vilas was a delegate to the Democratic National Convention of 1896, but withdrew after the adoption of the free-silver plank. He then became one of the chief organizers of the National Democratic Party, attended the convention at Indianapolis, and was chairman of its committee on resolutions. He was also the main drafter of the National Democratic Party's platform. Vilas, a favorite of the delegates, refused to run as the party's sacrificial lamb.

Back in Wisconsin, he was from 1897 to 1903 a member of the commission that had charge of the erection of the State Historical Library at Madison, and from 1906 to 1908 of the commission for the construction of the new state capitol.

Personal life
He married Anna M. Fox, who had been born in the territory of Wisconsin. Their younger son died in early childhood and their elder daughter, Nellie, died in 1893. The surviving children were Henry and Mary Esther.

He is interred at the Forest Hill Cemetery in Madison, Wisconsin.

Legacy
Vilas County, Wisconsin, is named for William F. Vilas. Senator Vilas is also the namesake of the towns of Vilas, Colorado and Vilas, South Dakota. His childhood home in Madison is located in what is now the Langdon Street Historic District. His family donated land to the city of Madison to build a public park, which later became a part of the Henry Vilas Zoo.

References

Sources

 Retrieved on 2008-02-15

External links
 

1840 births
1908 deaths
United States Postmasters General
United States Secretaries of the Interior
Democratic Party members of the Wisconsin State Assembly
Albany Law School alumni
University of Wisconsin–Madison alumni
Wisconsin lawyers
Union Army officers
People of Wisconsin in the American Civil War
People from Chelsea, Vermont
Democratic Party United States senators from Wisconsin
Cleveland administration cabinet members
19th-century American politicians
Burials in Wisconsin
Bourbon Democrats